Marina Tauber (born 1 May 1986) is a Moldovan politician. Since 2019 she has been a Member of the Parliament of the Republic of Moldova.

Biography
Marina Tauber was born in 1986, in Chișinău, in a family of Jewish origin. She was a high school colleague with Ilan Shor. In 2011 she graduated from the State University of Physical Education and Sport in Chișinău. She worked as a tennis player and coach.

Marina Tauber joined the Șor Party – then the Social-political movement "Ravnopravie" – in June 2016. She became vice president of the party shortly after Ilan Shor's election as the head of the political party. Tauber ran from the Shor Party for the mayoral post of the village of Jora de Mijloc during local early election, which she won. In the 2019 parliamentary elections, she became a Member of Parliament and she resigned from the position of mayor of Jora de Mijloc.

References

1986 births

Living people
Jewish Moldovan politicians
Politicians from Chișinău
Moldovan female tennis players
Moldovan MPs 2019–2023
Jewish mayors